Been Down So Long It Looks Like Up to Me is a 1971 American drama film directed by Jeffrey Young and written by Robert Schlitt and adapted from the Richard Fariña novel of the same name. The film stars Barry Primus, Susan Tyrrell, Bruce Davison and Zack Norman. The film was released on September 15, 1971, by Paramount Pictures.

Plot

Free-thinking student tries to put up with life at a strait-laced college in 1958.

Cast  
 Barry Primus as Gnossos "Paps" Pappadopoulis
 David Downing as Heff
 Susan Tyrrell as Jack
 Philip Shafer as "Flip"
 Bruce Davison as Fitzgore
 Zack Norman as "Mojo"
 Raúl Juliá as Juan Carlos Rosenbloom

See also
 List of American films of 1971

References

External links 
 

1971 films
Paramount Pictures films
American drama films
1971 drama films
1970s English-language films
1970s American films